San Isidro is a Panama Metro station on Line 1. It was open on 15 August 2015 as the northern terminus of an extension of Line 1 from Los Andes. It is an elevated station.

San Isidro station is located in San Miguelito District, above Highway 3, in San Isidro neighborhood.

References

Panama Metro stations
2015 establishments in Panama
Railway stations opened in 2015
San Miguelito District